Ten Rounds is the seventh studio album by American country music artist Tracy Byrd. Released in 2001 as his second album for RCA Nashville, it produced the singles "A Good Way to Get on My Bad Side", "Just Let Me Be in Love", and "Ten Rounds with Jose Cuervo", which became his second Number One hit on the Billboard country charts in 2002.

The track "How Much Does the World Weigh" was previously recorded by Sammy Kershaw on his 1999 album Maybe Not Tonight, and "Wildfire" is a cover of Michael Martin Murphey's hit single. In addition, Byrd's signature song "The Keeper of the Stars" was newly recorded for this collection.

Track listing

Personnel
Eddie Bayers - drums
Mike Brignardello - bass guitar
Marty Brown - background vocals
Tracy Byrd - lead vocals
Mark Chesnutt - duet vocals on "A Good Way to Get on My Bad Side"
Lisa Cochran - background vocals
John Cowan - background vocals
Eric Darken - percussion
Jerry Douglas - dobro
Dan Dugmore - steel guitar
Larry Franklin - fiddle, mandolin
Paul Franklin - steel guitar
Kenny Greenberg - electric guitar
Andy Griggs - background vocals
Tony Harrell - keyboards, synthesizer strings
Mike Haynes - trumpet
Wes Hightower - background vocals
John Barlow Jarvis - Hammond organ, piano, synthesizer
Paul Leim - drums, percussion
B. James Lowry - acoustic guitar
Liana Manis - background vocals
Brent Mason - electric guitar, gut string guitar
Russ Pahl - steel guitar
Steve Patrick - trumpet
Tammy Pierce - background vocals
Michael Rhodes - bass guitar
Rivers Rutherford - acoustic guitar
Scotty Sanders - steel guitar
Harry Stinson - background vocals
Billy Joe Walker Jr. - acoustic guitar, electric guitar
Biff Watson - acoustic guitar, electric guitar, Telecaster
Curtis Wright - background vocals

Charts

Weekly charts

Year-end charts

References

2001 albums
Tracy Byrd albums
RCA Records albums
Albums produced by Billy Joe Walker Jr.